Dasch is a German surname. Notable people with the surname include:

Annette Dasch (born 1976), German opera singer
George John Dasch (1903–1992), German World War II spy
Valentin Dasch (1930–1981), German politician

German-language surnames